Lieutenant General John Christopher Guise  (27 July 1826 – 5 February 1895) was a British Army officer and English recipient of the Victoria Cross, the highest and most prestigious award for gallantry in the face of the enemy that can be awarded to British and Commonwealth forces.

Guise attended Sandhurst and served in the Crimean War albeit briefly as he was forced to return home after falling ill.

During the Indian Mutiny, on 16 and 17 November 1857 at Lucknow, India, whilst a major in the 90th Regiment of Foot (later The Cameronians (Scottish Rifles)), Guise, together with sergeant (Samuel Hill), saved the life of a captain at the storming of the Secundra Bagh and also went in under heavy fire to help two wounded men. For this he was elected by the regiment to be awarded the VC. His citation reads:
 His VC is on display in the Lord Ashcroft Gallery at the Imperial War Museum, London.

He later achieved the rank of lieutenant general and was made colonel of The Leicestershire Regiment from 1890 until his death.

References

Location of grave and VC medal (Co. Wexford, Ireland)
 Profile

1826 births
1895 deaths
Graduates of the Royal Military College, Sandhurst
Cameronians officers
British Army lieutenant generals
British recipients of the Victoria Cross
British Army personnel of the Crimean War
Indian Rebellion of 1857 recipients of the Victoria Cross
Companions of the Order of the Bath
Younger sons of baronets
People from Highnam
British Army recipients of the Victoria Cross